Thomas Arnold (1795–1842) was an English educator and headmaster of Rugby School.

Thomas Arnold may also refer to:

Thomas Arnold (MP) (fl. 1420–1421), British Member of Parliament for Dover
Tom Arnold (literary scholar) (1823–1900), Thomas Arnold the Younger
Thomas Arnold (Royal Navy officer) (1679–1737), English captain in the navy
Thomas Arnold (physician) (1742–1816), English physician and writer on mental illness
Thomas Arnold (educator) (1816–1897), English pioneer in deaf education
Thomas Dickens Arnold (1798–1870), American congressman representing Tennessee
Thomas Kerchever Arnold (1800–1853), English theologian and writer of educational works
Thomas James Arnold (c. 1804–1877), English barrister
Thomas Arnold (police officer) (1835–1907), London police superintendent involved in the Jack the Ripper investigation
Thomas Walker Arnold (1864–1930), professor and eminent orientalist
Thomas J. Arnold (1864–1906), late 19th century English missionary to China
Thomas Arnold (bobsleigh) (1901–?), silver medalist at the 1924 Winter Olympics
Thomas Arnold (silversmith), American silversmith

See also
Tom Arnold (disambiguation)